Miguel Guadalupe Beltrán Ruiz Jr. (born 21 July 1989) is a Mexican professional boxer. He has challenged twice for junior lightweight world championships; the IBF title in 2011 and the WBO title in 2012.

Professional career
Beltrán made his professional debut on 12 May 2007, scoring a third-round technical knockout (TKO) over Juan Carlos Valenzuela at the Agua Caliente Racetrack in Tijuana, Mexico.

References

External links

Boxers from Sinaloa
Sportspeople from Los Mochis
Featherweight boxers
1989 births
Living people
Mexican male boxers